Ireland participated in the inaugural Paralympic Games in 1960 in Rome, Italy. The 1960 Paralympics, now considered to have been the first Paralympic Games, were initially known as the ninth Stoke Mandeville Games, Games for athletes with disabilities founded in Great Britain in 1948.

Ireland were one of 23 nations to enter athletes and the team of five athletes finished 12th in the medals table, winning two gold medals. Both of Ireland's gold medals were won by Joan Horan. Horan won her medals in two different sports, one in women's St. Nicholas Round open archery and one in the women's 25 m Crawl complete class 2 swimming event.

Medalists

See also

Ireland at the 1960 Summer Olympics

References

Nations at the 1960 Summer Paralympics
Ireland at the Paralympics
1960 in Irish sport